York North was a federal riding in Ontario, Canada, that was in the House of Commons of Canada from 1867 until 2004. 

York North may also refer to:

York North (New Brunswick provincial electoral district)
York North (Ontario provincial electoral district)

See also
 North York (disambiguation)